"Better Start Talking" is a song by American singer Donell Jones. It was written by Jones along with Ryan Leslie and Sean Garrett for his fourth studio album Journey of a Gemini (2006), while production was helmed by Leslie and Garrett. The song served as the first single from the album and reached number 72 on the Hot R&B/Hip-Hop Songs chart.

Track listings

Credits and personnel
 Chris Athens – mastering
 Blake Eiseman – recording
 Sean Garrett – producer, writer
 Donell Jones – vocals, writer
 Ryan Leslie – producer, writer
 Carlton Lynn – recording
 Pat Vialla  – mixing

Charts

References

2006 songs
2006 singles
Donell Jones songs
Songs written by Ryan Leslie
Song recordings produced by Ryan Leslie
Songs written by Sean Garrett
Jermaine Dupri songs
Songs written by Donell Jones